Daniel Ciechański (born February 26, 1995) is a Polish footballer who plays as a forward for Weszło Warsaw. Apart from his sports career, he works as a sports journalist for the Weszło media group.

Club career
In his career, he was associated with, among others, Pogoń Siedlce (then in I liga), Piast Gliwice (then in Ekstraklasa) and GKS Katowice (then in I liga). In 2019, he stopped playing professionally in football, leaving Elana Toruń's team.

In June 2019, he joined the amateur club Weszło Warsaw. In the 2020–21 Klasa A season, he contributed to the promotion of the club to the regional league, scoring over 60 goals.

References

External links
 
 

Polish footballers
Footballers from Warsaw
Living people
1995 births
Association football forwards
Chrobry Głogów players
MKP Pogoń Siedlce players
GKS Katowice players
Gryf Wejherowo players
GKS Bełchatów players
Elana Toruń players
KTS Weszło Warsaw players
Journalists from Warsaw
Polish sports journalists